Margaret Peterson Haddix (born April 9, 1964) is an American writer known best for the two children's series, Shadow Children (1998–2006) and The Missing (2008–2015). She also wrote the tenth volume in the multiple-author series The 39 Clues.

Biography
Haddix grew up on a farm about halfway between two small towns: Washington Court House, Ohio, and Sabina, Ohio. Her family was predominantly farmers and she grew up in a family of voracious readers. Some of her favorite books growing up included E.L. Konigsburg books, Harriet the Spy, Anne of Green Gables, Louisa May Alcott’s Little Women, Anne Frank, Rebecca of Sunnybrook Farm, and The Little Princess. 

She graduated from Miami University in Oxford, Ohio with degrees in English/journalism, English/Creative writing, and History. While in college, Haddix worked a series of jobs. She was an assistant cook at a 4-H camp, but almost every other job has been related to writing.  During college, she worked on the school newspaper and had summer internships at newspapers in Urbana, Ohio; Charlotte, North Carolina; and Indianapolis, Indiana.

Haddix chose to pursue fiction writing after her husband, Doug, became a news reporter, because she did not want to be his employee. Her previous work as a reporter inspired her to write fiction. After documenting a wide variety of topics, she wanted to create her own plots and characters. Haddix experienced a long period of having her writing rejected by publishers before her first two books were accepted in 1995 and 1996. Her first book was Running Out of Time, published when Haddix was pregnant with her second child, and her first child was one and a half years old. Her second book, Don't You Dare Read This, Mrs. Dunphrey, followed shortly after. The Summer of Broken Things, written in 2018, is Haddix’s most recently published stand-alone book.

Haddix has written more than 40 books for children and teenagers, including Running Out of Time, Don't You Dare Read This, Mrs. Dunphrey, Leaving Fishers, Just Ella, Turnabout, Takeoffs and Landings, The Girl with 500 Middle Names, Because of Anya, Escape from Memory, Say What?, The House on the Gulf, Double Identity, Dexter the Tough, Uprising, Palace of Mirrors, Claim to Fame, The Always War, Game Changer, the Shadow Children series, and the Missing series. She also wrote Into the Gauntlet, book 10 in The 39 Clues series. Her books have made New York Times Best Seller lists and American Library Association (ALA) annual book lists and they have won the International Reading Association's Children's Book Award and more than a dozen state reader's choice awards.

The New York Times’ best-selling author currently lives in Columbus, Ohio with her husband, Doug, and are the parents of two grown children, Meredith and Connor.

Bibliography

Shadow Children series 
 Among the Hidden (1998)
 Among the Impostors (2001)
 Among the Betrayed (2002)
 Among the Barons (2003)
 Among the Brave (2004)
 Among the Enemy (2005)
 Among the Free (2006)

The Palace Chronicles 
 Just Ella (1999)
 Palace of Mirrors (2008)
 Palace of Lies (2015)

The Missing series 
 Found (2008)
 Sent (2009)
 Sabotaged (2010)
 Torn (2011)
 Caught (2012)
 Sought (E-book short story, 2013)
 Risked (2013)
 Rescued (E-book short story, 2014)
 Revealed (2014)
 Redeemed (2015)

The 39 Clues series 
 Into the Gauntlet (Scholastic Publishing, 2010), Book 10 in The 39 Clues series

Children of Exile series 
 Children of Exile (2016)
 Children of Refuge (2017)
 Children of Jubilee (2018)

Under Their Skin series 
 Under Their Skin (2016)
 In Over Their Heads (2017)

The Greystone Secrets series 
 The Strangers (2019)
 The Deceivers (2020)
 The Messengers (2021)

Stand-alone novels 
 Running Out of Time (1995)
 Don't You Dare Read This, Mrs. Dunphrey (1996)
 Leaving Fishers (1997)
 Turnabout (2000)
 Takeoffs and Landings (2001)
 The Girl With 500 Middle Names (2001)
 Because of Anya (2002)
 Escape from Memory (2003)
 Say What? (2004)
 The House on the Gulf (2004)
 Double Identity (2005)
 Uprising (2007)
 Dexter the Tough (2007)
 Claim to Fame (2009)
 The Always War (2011)
 Game Changer (2012)
 Full Ride (2013)
 The Summer of Broken Things (2018)

Awards

References

External links

 
 Reviews of her books
 
 
 Spanish translation of among the hidden (entre los escondidos)

1964 births
20th-century American novelists
21st-century American novelists
American children's writers
American science fiction writers
American women novelists
American young adult novelists
Novelists from Ohio
Miami University alumni
Living people
People from Washington Court House, Ohio
American women children's writers
Women science fiction and fantasy writers
20th-century American women writers
21st-century American women writers
Women writers of young adult literature
Writers of young adult science fiction